Bridget Everett (born April 21, 1972) is an American comedian, actress, singer, writer, and cabaret performer. She has starred in the semi-autobiographical 2022 HBO series Somebody Somewhere, the movie Fun Mom Dinner, and in a one-hour Comedy Central special in 2015. She also had a supporting role in the motion picture Patti Cake$, and performed stand-up on Inside Amy Schumer. Everett has described herself as an “alt-cabaret provocateur.”

Early life
Originally from Manhattan, Kansas, she has been performing in New York City for over a decade.

Everett is the youngest of six children born to Donn James Everett and Frederica 'Freddie' Everett. Her siblings are Brinton, Brad, Alice, Brian and Brock.  As Everett stated on the podcast Amy Schumer Presents: 3 Girls, 1 Keith (episode 2: "Moms and Stuff"): “I’m from Manhattan, Kansas - the little apple. And my dad was mayor at one point, and then so was my brother many years later. So we’re kinda like the Kennedys of Manhattan, Kansas." Her father, who also served in both houses of the Kansas state legislature, died in 2007.

Everett's mother was a music teacher and gave her a love of music. Her parents officially divorced when she was eight but had been living apart since her early years. Her father, an attorney, was not around much.

Everett grew up as a competitive swimmer and was involved in both traditional and show choir. She attended college at Arizona State University on a full scholarship to study music and opera.  She worked in the restaurant business for 25 years before she was finally able to quit around the beginning of 2015.

Career

Everett met Amy Schumer at the Just for Laughs comedy festival in 2009.  Everett has been regularly opening for Schumer on her comedy tours since 2012.  Everett has even upstaged Schumer, then leading Schumer to want to have Everett close for her instead, according to Schumer on her podcast.

Everett often performs with her band, The Tender Moments, which includes Adam “Ad-Rock” Horovitz from the Beastie Boys and Carmine Covelli from The Julie Ruin. In October 2013, Everett and Horovitz performed in a show called Rock Bottom that the two co-wrote with Hairspray songwriters Marc Shaiman and Scott Wittman. Rock Bottom won Everett the 2015 Obie Awards Special Citation presented by the American Theatre Wing. In 2013, Bridget Everett and the Tender Moments released an album with twelve tracks entitled Pound It!

Everett has also performed with Brad Williams in a show called Down n Dirty (hosted by Broad Citys Abbi Jacobson and Ilana Glazer) at the 2014 Bonnaroo Music Festival.

Everett performed a duet of "Me and Bobby McGee" with Patti LuPone at Carnegie Hall.

Everett's first one-hour TV special, Bridget Everett: Gynecological Wonder, premiered on Comedy Central in 2015. In it, she performs her usual brand of comedy cabaret.

On August 1, 2017, Everett got a standing ovation for her "Piece of My Heart" karaoke performance on The Tonight Show Starring Jimmy Fallon. On January 3, 2018 The Tonight Show aired a repeat of Everett performing "Piece of My Heart". She also performed the song in the third episode of the 2022 TV show Somebody Somewhere.

Discography
All releases are with The Tender Moments and all formats are download and streaming.

Albums
 2013: Pound It (Beavertails Music)
 2015: Gynecological Wonder (Comedy Partners)

Singles
 2013: "Titties"
 2013: "What I Gotta Do?" (Dirty Version)
 2016: "Eat It"
 2017: "Pussy Grabs Back" (All proceeds go to Planned Parenthood, download only.)

Home videos
 2015: Gynecological Wonder (Comedy Central)

Collaborations
 2014: Champagne Jerry: For Real, You Guys - 3 songs: "More Wet", "Aspirbations Skit" (feat. Adam Horovitz & Bridget Everett) & "Just Woke Up" (vocals)
 2015: The Dan Band: The Wedding Album - song: "Making Love Forever" (vocals and songwriter)
 2016: Champagne Jerry: The Champagne Room - song: "One Talent" (feat. Bridget Everett, Murray Hill, Erin Markey, Larry Krone, Jim Andralis & the Champagne Club) (vocals)
 2016: Jim Andralis & Bridget Everett: "Hit the Ground Fuckin'" - Single (backing vocals)

Filmography

Film

Television

Music videos

Video games

Stage

References

External links

 
 

1972 births
Living people
American cabaret performers
American comedy musicians
American entertainers
American women singer-songwriters
American film actresses
American humorists
American novelty song performers
American women podcasters
American podcasters
American television actresses
American vedettes
American women comedians
Arizona State University alumni
Cabaret composers
Cabaret singers
Feminist artists
Feminist musicians
People from Manhattan, Kansas
Activists from Kansas
Actresses from Kansas
Comedians from Kansas
Vedettes (cabaret)
21st-century American actresses
21st-century American comedians
21st-century American musicians
21st-century American singers
21st-century American women singers
Women humorists
Singer-songwriters from Kansas